Ricky Ball is a musician from New Zealand. He played drums in the following bands: the Beatboys, the Courtiers, Challenge, Ticket, Jimmy Sloggett Band, Tommy Ferguson's Goodtime Band, Rainbow, Hello Sailor, Woody, the Pink Flamingos (briefly, at the beginning) and Beaver.

Woody (consisting of three-quarters of Ticket among the line up) was a resident band at Jilly's in Auckland, one of several nightclubs in New Zealand run by Maurice Greer, formerly of Human Instinct.

According to Stranded in Paradise, Ricky Ball owned a boutique when he joined the Pink Flamingos and left when they were likely to be more than a resident band at Jilly's.

Awards

Aotearoa Music Awards
The Aotearoa Music Awards (previously known as New Zealand Music Awards (NZMA)) are an annual awards night celebrating excellence in New Zealand music and have been presented annually since 1965.

! 
|-
| 2011 || Ricky Ball(as part of Hello Sailor) || New Zealand Music Hall of Fame ||  || 
|-

References

 Dix, John, Stranded in Paradise, Penguin, 2005. 
 Eggleton, David, Ready To Fly, Craig Potton, 2003.

External links
Ticket at New Zealand Music of the 60's and 70's
Hello Sailor at New Zealand Music of the 60's and 70's

Living people
Year of birth missing (living people)
New Zealand drummers
Male drummers